The 1939 Pacific typhoon season has no official bounds; it ran year-round in 1939, but most tropical cyclones tend to form in the northwestern Pacific Ocean between May and November. These dates conventionally delimit the period of each year when most tropical cyclones form in the northwestern Pacific Ocean.

The scope of this article is limited to the Pacific Ocean, north of the equator and west of the international date line. Storms that form east of the date line and north of the equator are called hurricanes; see 1939 Pacific hurricane season. Storms in the season were tracked by the United States Weather Bureau and released in the Monthly Weather Review under the header "Typhoons and Depressions over the Far East". The Monthly Weather Review only covers tropical cyclones west of 150° E. Due to lack of satellites and ship reports due to the Pacific Theatre of World War II, it is possible other tropical cyclones existed, especially if they were short-lived or of minor intensity.

There were 29 known tropical cyclones, including 24 of typhoon status, of which several of the storms were deadly. A typhoon in November was the deadliest cyclone of the season, causing 49 deaths as it crossed the Philippines. The same typhoon later struck Hong Kong, where the Hong Kong Observatory recorded the first period of calm during the eye of a cyclone. At least 151 people were killed during the season, with 12 missing and unconfirmed of their status during some point during the season.

Systems

February–May 

The depression remained nearly stationary for two days until turning to a steady northwest motion. The depression was last observed on February 16 accelerating towards the Aleutian Islands. The system produced heavy rainfall in the Philippines, with extensive flooding reported in Surigao del Norte.

It moved westward, northward, and ultimately to the west-northwest before developing into a tropical depression on May 2 to the east of the Philippines. Early on May 3, after intensifying into a tropical storm the system struck Samar Island, and the next day it hit Masbate before turning northward. After passing over northern Luzon on May 5, the storm accelerated northeastward as it moved through the Luzon Strait, and intensified into a typhoon on May 7. The storm produced strong winds throughout the eastern portions of the Philippine archipelago. 90 fishermen were caught in the storm, with one person drowning and eleven missing at one estimate made one month after the storm passed the area. Winds reached tropical storm force in southern Japan.

A tropical depression developed on May 26 in the northern portion of the South China Sea. After initially moving to the northwest, the depression later turned to the northeast and quickly intensified to attain typhoon status by May 28 while located to the east of Hainan Island. The typhoon stalled on May 30 before turning to the west, and moved inland on southern China on May 31.

July 

Based on the report, it is estimated it intensified into a typhoon, and after turning northeastward upon entering the Yellow Sea it struck North Korea. The storm turned to the east, and was last observed on July 12 in the open Pacific Ocean. Rainfall and flooding from the typhoon and several other storms during the month resulted in two deaths and considerable damage to private and public property in the Philippines.

The depression tracked northwestward initially, and after intensifying into a typhoon its motion turned to the north-northeast, followed by a turn back to the northwest on July 10. The storm weakened as it continued its motion while roughly paralleling the northern coastline, and dissipated on July 13. The passage of the typhoon killed at least six people in Shanghai.

It initially moved northwestward, then a day later turned to the northeast. After passing through the Luzon Strait, the typhoon changed its motion to the northwest, resulting in a landfall on northern Taiwan. A station on western Luzon recorded minor winds and slightly below normal pressures in association with the system.

On July 22, a low pressure area formed into a tropical depression while located about halfway between the Philippines and the Marianas Islands. The depression steadily intensified as it tracked to the northwest, and attained typhoon status on July 18. It quickly dissipated.

A tropical depression formed on July 20 while located between the Philippines and the Marianas Islands. After moving steadily northwestward, the system stalled for two days, and later turned to the north-northeast. The storm intensified into a typhoon shortly before crossing the Ryūkyū Islands, after which it turned sharply westward. Unfavorable conditions encountered the storm, and it rapidly dissipated over the open waters of the East China Sea on July 27.

The typhoon turned to the northwest, passing just south of the Japanese island of Kyūshū. It turned to the west, crossing the Yellow Sea and striking the Chinese province of Shandong before dissipating on July 25.

On July 22, a small typhoon developed a short distance off the coast of Taiwan. It drifted northwestward, then turned to the northeast, and by July 24 unfavorable conditions caused it to dissipate.

An area of low pressure organized into a tropical depression on July 25 over the open waters of the western Pacific Ocean. The depression tracked northwestward, and gradually strengthened to attain typhoon status on July 27. After turning to the west, it gradually recurved towards the north and approached northern Taiwan. Under varying steering currents, the typhoon executed a counterclockwise loop over the country, and exited from the southern coastline after turning eastward. After reaching the Ryūkyū Islands on August 3, the storm stalled, turned to the northwest for a day, then weakened until dissipating on August 6 to the south of Japan after turning to the east.

On July 28, a low pressure area formed into a tropical depression over the Marianas Islands. After changing its motion to the west, the typhoon turned sharply northward on July 31, followed by a turn to the east-northeast. The storm passed through the Ogasawara Islands on August 2, and halted its forward motion before turning to the northwest. On August 6 the typhoon struck south-central Japan and later the island of Hokkaidō after turning to the northeast, and it was last observed on August 8 in the open western Pacific Ocean.

August 
From August 1–3, a tropical cyclone existed near the Ryukyu Islands.

September 

The depression never affected land.

On September 17 a tropical depression developed in the South China Sea. It tracked westward, and intensified into a typhoon. Meteorological details for the typhoon are unavailable due to the presence of the Pacific Theatre of World War II.

The depression slowly intensified as it moved generally northwestward, and by September 21 it attained typhoon status while located about east of Aparri on Luzon. Shortly after strengthening into a typhoon, the storm turned to the northeast and paralleled the southern coastline of Japan a short distance offshore. It was last observed on September 24.

Atmospheric pressure was relatively low over the South China Sea during the last week of September, and subsequent to the development of a circulation in an area of disturbed weather, a tropical depression formed on September 27. It quickly strengthened to typhoon status, and made landfall on eastern Vietnam just south of Da Nang on September 30. The storm quickly weakened over land, with only slight traces of the former typhoon by the following day.

October 

The system gradually strengthened to typhoon status while it tracked west-northwestward. Under unfavorable conditions the typhoon steadily weakened over the subsequent days, and dissipated on October 12 over the southern portion of the Taiwan Strait. Damage was minor over northern Luzon.

A tropical depression was first observed on October 7 to the east-northeast of Guam. Tracking to the northwest, the depression steadily intensified to attain typhoon status. Several days later, it began to weaken while gradually recurving to the northeast, and on October 13 it became extratropical.

It initially moved west-northwestward, and strengthened into a typhoon on October 11 while briefly changing its motion to the southwest. After passing through the Ryūkyū Islands, it weakened as it turned to the northeast and east, and on October 17 it was last observed turning to the southeast over the open Pacific Ocean. The passage of the typhoon caused 33 fatalities in Japan.

After initially moving northwestward, it turned to the north and intensified into a typhoon on October 22. The typhoon was last observed on October 23 accelerating northeastward.

November–December 
It moved quickly to the west-northwest, and struck the Philippine island of Samar without strengthening further. After passing through the archipelago, the storm entered the South China Sea late on November 5, and gradually weakened until dissipation on November 9 near southwestern Taiwan. Reports from the country indicate it was potentially a typhoon, though meteorologists decided it was not due to relatively high pressures and lack of significant convection to the southwest of the center.

It initially moved to the west-northwest, and gradually recurved to the northeast. After accelerating east-northeastward, the depression was last observed on November 13 as a remnant low pressure area over the open western Pacific Ocean. It is unknown if it strengthened into a tropical storm.

On November 22 a tropical depression formed to the east of Mindanao, and subsequently tracked to the northwest. Cold air intruded the circulation on November 25, and two days later it became extratropical.

It moved to the northwest, and struck Samar Island on December 2. The typhoon continued northwestward through the archipelago, and gradually weakened while drifting through the South China Sea. It turned to the northeast, and dissipated on December 5 off the coast of northern Luzon. The typhoon produced heavy rainfall and strong winds along its path through the Philippines. Rivers throughout Masbate island were overflown from the abundant rainfall, causing 34 fatalities on the island.

After moving west-northwestward for several days, it turned to the northeast on December 9, during which it attained typhoon status. The typhoon maintained peak winds for about two days before quickly weakening to a remnant area of low pressure on December 11.

The storm struck southeastern Luzon and turned to the north and north-northeast. After passing near Manila it reached open waters on December 20. For the following two days, it drifted eastward, possibly executing a loop, and after accelerating to the northeast it was last observed on December 24. While passing through the northern Philippines, the typhoon produced heavy rainfall, killing 19 on Masbate and 14 in northern Luzon.

It initially moved to the northwest, and on December 24 the typhoon turned to the east-northeast. It steadily weakened, and was last observed on December 26 accelerating out to sea.

Hong Kong typhoon (Typhoon Twenty-Three) 

On November 18 a tropical depression was first observed to the east of Mindanao. The depression steadily intensified as it tracked west-northwestward, and intensified into a typhoon before striking Samar Island and Leyte Island on November 19. It continued westward until reaching the western region of the South China Sea on November 22. An approaching cold front turned the typhoon to the northeast, resulting in a rare occurrence of a typhoon recurving northeastward in the western portion of the South China Sea. On November 24 the typhoon passed over Macau, and two hours later the eye crossed directly over Hong Kong. The calm of the center of the eye lasted for fifteen minutes at the Hong Kong Observatory, the first time on record that the calm of a typhoon was recorded there. The typhoon began to become extratropical after making landfall, and continued northeastward through southern China. It gradually weakened while passing through the Taiwan Strait and possibly over Taiwan before dissipating on November 26.

The passage of the typhoon sunk a motor boat on Masbate island, killing 48 of the 50 occupants aboard. One person was reported missing and presumed dead in Balangiga in Eastern Samar, believed to be caused by drowning. Property damage was great in Samar, Leyte, and Capiz provinces. In Hong Kong, wind gusts reached  during a rainband ahead of the storm. The heaviest rainfall occurred in rainbands ahead of the typhoon, with about  falling during a 1-hour time period. The lowest pressure recorded in Hong Kong was about  while the typhoon was passing through the area. Damage was minor in Hong Kong.

See also 

 1939 Pacific hurricane season
 1939 Atlantic hurricane season
 1930s North Indian Ocean cyclone seasons
 1900–1950 South-West Indian Ocean cyclone seasons
 1900–1940 South Pacific cyclone seasons
 1930s Australian region cyclone seasons
 Bernard Doucette

References 

Pacific Typhoon Season, 1939
Pre-1940 Pacific typhoon seasons
1939 in Asia
1939 in Oceania
1939 natural disasters